A double-elimination tournament is a type of elimination tournament competition in which a participant ceases to be eligible to win the tournament's championship upon having lost two games or matches. It stands in contrast to a single-elimination tournament, in which only one defeat results in elimination.

One method of arranging a double-elimination tournament is to break the competitors into two sets of brackets, the winners' bracket and losers' bracket (W and L brackets for short; also referred to as championship bracket and elimination bracket, upper bracket and lower bracket, or main bracket and repechage) after the first round. The first-round winners proceed into the W bracket and the losers proceed into the L bracket. The W bracket is conducted in the same manner as a single-elimination tournament, except that the losers of each round "drop down" into the L bracket. Another method of double-elimination tournament management is the Draw and Process.

As with single-elimination tournaments, most often the number of competitors is equal to a power of two (8, 16, 32, etc.) so that in each round there is an even number of competitors and never any byes. 

The number of games in a double-elimination tournament is one or two less than twice the number of teams participating (e.g. 8 teams would see 14 or 15 games).

Conducting the tournament
If the standard double-elimination bracket arrangement is being used, then each round of the L bracket is conducted in two stages: a minor stage followed by a major stage. Both contain the same number of matches (assuming there are no byes) which is the same again as the number of matches in the corresponding round of the W bracket. If the minor stage of an L bracket round contains N matches, it will produce N winners. Meanwhile, the N matches in the corresponding round of the W bracket will produce N losers. These 2N competitors will then pair off in the N matches of the corresponding major stage of the L bracket.

For example, in an eight-competitor double-elimination tournament, the four losers of the first round, W bracket quarter finals, pair off in the first stage of the L bracket, the L bracket minor semifinals. The two losers are eliminated, while the two winners proceed to the L bracket major semifinals. Here, those two players/teams will each compete against a loser of the W bracket semifinal in the L bracket major semifinals. The winners of the L bracket major semifinals compete against each other in the L bracket minor-final, with the winner playing the loser of the W bracket final in the L bracket major final.

The final round of a double-elimination tournament is usually set up to be a possible two games, with the second referred to as the "if game". In this structure, the L bracket finalist needs to win both games of the final round to be the tournament champion, while the W bracket finalist wins the tournament by winning either game of the final round. If the final round is scheduled as only a single game, as in the 2018 NCAA Beach Volleyball Championship, the W bracket finalist will be eliminated from the tournament if they lose this match; contrary to "real" double elimination.

Pros and cons
The double-elimination format has some advantages over the single-elimination format, most notably the fact that third and fourth places can be determined without the use of a consolation or "classification" match involving two contestants who have already been eliminated from winning the championship.

Some tournaments, such as in tennis, will use "seeding" to prevent the strongest contestants from meeting until the later round. However, in tournaments where contestants are placed randomly in the draw, or in situations where seeding is not available, it is possible for two of the strongest teams to meet in the early rounds rather than a final or semifinal as would be expected in a seeded draw. Double elimination overcomes this shortfall by allowing a strong team which loses early to work their way through the L bracket and progress to the later rounds, despite meeting the strongest team in the early rounds of competition.

Another advantage of the double-elimination format is the fact that all competitors will play at least twice and three quarters will play three games or more. In a single-elimination tournament with no byes, half of the competitors will be eliminated after their first game. This can be disappointing to those who had to travel to the tournament and were only able to play once.

A disadvantage compared to the single-elimination format is that at least twice the number of matches have to be conducted. Since each competitor has to lose twice and since the tournament ends when only one competitor remains, in a tournament for n competitors there will be either 2n − 2 or 2n − 1 games depending on whether or not the winner was undefeated during the tournament. This may result in a scheduling hardship for venues where only one facility for play is available. However, the number of matches is still lower than what is required by a Swiss-system tournament or round-robin tournament.

If the championship final has two matches scheduled (as typical of a double-elimination tournament), should the winners’ bracket winner defeats the losers’ bracket winner, the tournament ends. It is therefore unknown, until this match has been concluded, whether the second scheduled match will in fact be required. This can also be seen as a disadvantage of the system, particularly if broadcasting and ticket sales companies have an interest in the tournament.

Another substantial disadvantage of the double-elimination format is the fact that some games are played by competitors that have completed the unequal number of matches so far in the tournament. For example, a competitor needs 4 games to qualify for the final through the W bracket in a tournament with 16 competitors. Competitors that work their way through the L bracket must play around 5-7, games to reach the final. The unequal number of completed matches might lead to unfair competition, especially in the final: while one final competitor waits too long for the next game, another final competitor must play multiple matches in a short time, one after another, without sufficient regeneration.

Examples of use

Baseball 

The NCAA baseball tournament employs a double-elimination format, including the Men's College World Series, where a team is not eliminated until it loses twice in each of the four rounds (regional, super regional, Men's College World Series, and MCWS championship, with the super regional and MCWS championship series featuring two teams in a best-of-3 format). The NCAA softball tournament (including the Women's College World Series) uses a virtually identical format, with the only difference being in the format of the respective College World Series. The eight teams in the MCWS are split into two double-elimination brackets, with the survivor of each bracket advancing to the championship series. The WCWS also features eight teams initially divided into two brackets, and the championship is also determined in a best-of-3 series. However, the loser of the second-round game in each bracket, featuring the winners of that bracket's first-round games, is moved into the opposite bracket to play an elimination game. This format means that any two of the participating teams can advance to the championship series, which the current MCWS format does not allow.

The Little League World Series switched from round-robin to double-elimination formats for each of its pools starting in 2010 in an effort to eliminate meaningless games. The World Baseball Classic used a double-elimination format for its second rounds of the tournament in 2009 and 2013, as well as in its first round in 2009. The 2020 Olympic baseball event also used a modified double elimination bracket, combined with a preliminary group stage.

Other sports 

Double-elimination brackets are also popular in amateur wrestling of all levels, whereas in professional wrestling, World Championship Wrestling (WCW) and Total Nonstop Action Wrestling (TNA) were the only professional wrestling promotions to date to use the double-elimination format. WCW used the format for a tournament for the vacant WCW World Tag Team Championship in 1999. On the June 26, 2002, weekly Asylum PPV, TNA used a double-elimination match to determine the TNA X Championship in a four-way match featuring AJ Styles, Jerry Lynn, Low Ki, and Psicosis.

Pool, surfing, windsurfing and kiteboarding freestyle competitions, as well as Curling bonspiels (where triple-elimination is also used), Hardcourt Bike Polo are all known to sometimes use double-elimination formats. It is also used in table football tournaments.

In contract bridge, the English Bridge Union Spring Foursomes, first contested in 1962, uses a double-elimination format. It is also used, in modified form, in the All-Ireland Senior Gaelic Football Championship and All-Ireland Senior Hurling Championship.

It is also used largely in Esport competitions such as Counter-Strike, League of Legends, Street Fighter V and such.

Variations
In judo, players that end up in the L bracket can finish in third place at best. The winner of the W bracket will win the tournament, with the losing finalist finishing second. The other losers of the W bracket will end up in the L bracket, which will only be played to the minor stage of the final, resulting in two players placed third. Thus, compared to double elimination, there is no major stage of the L bracket final played, and there is no game between the winners of the W and L brackets.

Another aspect of the system used in judo is that losers of the first round (of the W bracket) only advance to the L bracket if the player they lost to wins their match of the second round. If a player loses to a second round loser, they are eliminated from the tournament.

Another variant, called the (third-place) challenge, is used, particularly in scholastic wrestling. The winner of the L bracket may challenge the loser of the finals in the W bracket, if and only if the two contestants had not faced each other previously; if the challenger (the winner of the L bracket) wins, they are awarded second place, and the loser of the W final is dropped to third place. This system is used particularly where the top two places advance to a higher level of competition (example: advancement from a regional tournament to a state tournament).

Another is the balanced variant which is a bracket arrangement that is not strictly divided into two brackets based on number of losses. Players with different numbers of losses can play each other in any round. A goal of the variant is that no player sits idle for more than one round consecutively. The added complexity of the brackets is handled by using "if necessary" matches. The flexible approach allows practical bracket designs to be made for any number of competitors including odd numbers (9, 10, 11, 12, 13, etc.).

A possible alternative is a single-elimination format where each match is a best-of-5-or-more series. This format still allows a competitor to lose (perhaps multiple times) while still remaining eligible to win the tournament. Of course, having multiple games in each series also requires considerably more games to be conducted. It is also susceptible to bad seeding.

Another is the modified single-elimination tournament which guarantees at least two games per competitor, but not necessarily two losses for elimination. The brackets are similar to double-elimination, except the two finalists from the L bracket (each with one loss) face the two finalists from the W bracket (neither with a loss) in a single elimination semi-final and final.

The Little League World Series began using a modified double-elimination bracket in 2011.  Eight U.S. teams and eight international teams compete in respective double elimination formats until their respective championship games, which are single elimination. That is, irrespective of whether a team has one loss, or no losses, that team would be eliminated with a loss in either the U.S. or international championship game. The two respective champions then play a single elimination game for the World Series championship.

Many esports competitions, such as The International use a variation on the double-elimination format where, after the initial group stage, the first round of the L bracket begins pre-seeded with the lower-performing teams from said stage, rather than all teams starting in the W bracket. Additionally, the finals are a single series regardless of winner, without any chance of a bracket reset if the L bracket winner wins the series. Much of this is due to time concerns, with some esports games taking upwards of an hour per match in a series, and the schedule not allowing for the additional time costs of scheduling like a traditional double-elimination tournament. However, many events that employ this format also schedule the event so that the W bracket teams have advantageous scheduling, with L bracket teams often having to play additional series on the final day, and W bracket teams getting considerably more time off to watch opponents.

While the FIFA World Cup's bracket is single-elimination by design, the semi-final round is double elimination, in which the losers play each other for third place.

Other tournament systems
Variations of the double-elimination tournament include:
 Elimination tournament
 Single-elimination tournament
Other common tournament types are
 Round-robin tournament
 Swiss system tournament
 Playoffs – a variation of the single-elimination tournament where instead of one win, a team needs to win a specific number of games in a series in order to advance.

References

External links
 Stanton Isabelle & Williams Virginia Vassilevska, 2013. "The structure, efficacy, and manipulation of double-elimination tournaments," Journal of Quantitative Analysis in Sports, De Gruyter, vol. 9(4), pages 319–335, December.

Tournament systems